Ali Khan Samsudin, (January 3, 1958 – December 1, 2006 in Kuala Lumpur) was known as Malaysia's "snake king".  He earned the title after living with 400 cobras, for 12 hours a day for 40 days, in a small room in the early 1990s.  He also earned the title of "scorpion king" after his feat of living in a glass enclosure with 6,000 scorpions for 21 days which is listed in the 1998 Guinness Book of World Records.

He had a protégé, Nur Malena Hassan, who has completed her own two record-breaking stunts and is now known as the "scorpion queen".

Death
Ali Khan died on December 1, 2006, after being bitten by a king cobra.  He is survived by his two wives and five children.

Footnotes

1958 births
2006 deaths
Malaysian people of Malay descent
Deaths due to snake bites
Accidental deaths in Malaysia